Batman/The Spirit is a 2007 one-shot comic book written by Jeph Loeb with art by Darwyn Cooke and J. Bone. Published by DC Comics, the comic is a crossover between Batman and the Spirit.

Plot summary

When the American Criminologist Association holds its annual convention, America's criminals hold a gathering of their own. Batman's rogues gallery joins forces with the Spirit's villains.

Awards
Batman/The Spirit won the 2007 Eisner Award for Best Single Issue. Colorist Dave Stewart won the Eisner for Best Coloring in part for his work on Batman/The Spirit.

Darwyn Cooke won the 2007 Joe Shuster Award for Outstanding Artist for both Batman/The Spirit and his The Spirit ongoing series which followed.

Collected editions
Batman/The Spirit is included in the trade paperback Will Eisner's The Spirit Vol. 1.

References

External links

2007 comics debuts
Intercompany crossovers
Team-up comics
Eisner Award winners